Daniel Francis Walsh (born October 2, 1937) is an American prelate of the Roman Catholic Church.

Walsh first served as an auxiliary bishop of the Archdiocese of San Francisco in California from 1981 to 1987, then as bishop of the Diocese of Reno-Las Vegas in Nevada from 1987 to 1995.  With the creation of the Diocese of Las Vegas, Walsh served there as bishop from 1995 to 2000.  Walsh then served as bishop of the Diocese of Santa Rosa in California from 2000 to 2011.

Biography

Early life and priesthood 
Danial Walsh was born on October 2, 1937, in San Francisco, California.

Walsh was ordained to the priesthood for the Archdiocese of San Francisco on March 30, 1963, in the Mission Dolores Basilica by Joseph Thomas McGucken.  After his ordination, Walsh served as associate pastor of St. Pius Parish in Redwood City, Californina. The next year, he went to Washington D.C. to enter the Catholic University of America.

From 1966 to 1970, Walsh taught at Junípero Serra High School in San Mateo, California. He served as assistant chancellor for the archdiocese from 1970 to 1976.  He then held the position of private secretary to Archbishop Joseph McGucken until 1978. Walsh became chancellor of the archdiocese in 1978, and its vicar general in 1981.

Auxiliary Bishop of San Francisco 
On July 30, 1981, Pope John Paul II appointed Walsh as an auxiliary bishop of the Archdiocese of San Francisco and titular bishop of Tigias.  He was consecrated on September 24, 1981 by Archbishop John Quinn, with Bishops Michael Kenny and Joseph Ferrario serving as co-consecrators, in the Cathedral of Saint Mary of the Assumption in San Francisco.

Bishop of Reno-Las Vegas 
On June 9, 1987, Pope John Paul II appointed Walsh as bishop of the Diocese of Reno-Las Vegas. He was installed on August 6, 1987.

Bishop of Las Vegas 
On March 1, 1995, Walsh was appointed as bishop of the new Diocese of Las Vegas by Pope John Paul II.  This diocese and the new Diocese of Reno had been carved out of the former Diocese of Reno-Las Vegas.  Walsh was installed on July 28, 1995.

Bishop of Santa Rosa 
On April 11, 2000, John Paul II appointed Walsh as the fifth bishop of the Diocese of Santa Rosa. He was installed on May 22, 2000.

In August 2006, the Sonoma County, California, Sheriff's Office recommended criminal charges be filed against Walsh for not reporting multiple child molestations by Francisco Ochoa.  Ochoa was a priest in the Diocese of Santa Rosa who had confessed sexual abuse crimes to Walsh.  Walsh immediately suspended Ochoa but failed to report these crimes to police during the five-day time period mandated by law.  This delay enabled Ochoa to flee to Mexico to avoid prosecution.  The Sonoma County District Attorney's Office eventually approved a plea agreement for Walsh, which called for four months of counseling in lieu of prosecution.  Had the plea agreement not been reached, it would have been the first civil prosecution of an American bishop in concealing sex crimes. On September 14, 2007, the diocese settled a lawsuit by ten individuals who alleged they had been sexually abused by Ochoa.  The diocese paid them a $5 million settlement, including $20,000 donated by Walsh himself.

Within the United States Conference of Catholic Bishops, Walsh chaired the Committee on World Missions, and sat on the Committee on Evangelization and Catechesis. On January 24, 2011, Bishop Robert F. Vasa from the Diocese of Baker was appointed as coadjutor bishop for the Diocese of Santa Rosa.

On June 30, 2011, Pope Benedict XVI accepted Walsh's resignation as bishop of the Diocese of Santa Rosa and Vasa became his successor.

See also
 

 Catholic Church hierarchy
 Catholic Church in the United States
 Historical list of the Catholic bishops of the United States
 List of Catholic bishops of the United States
 Lists of patriarchs, archbishops, and bishops

References

External links
Catholic-Hierarchy
Diocese of Santa Rosa

1937 births
Catholic University of America alumni
Living people
People from San Francisco
Roman Catholic Archdiocese of San Francisco
Roman Catholic bishops of Santa Rosa in California
Roman Catholic bishops of Las Vegas
Roman Catholic bishops of Reno-Las Vegas
20th-century Roman Catholic bishops in the United States
21st-century Roman Catholic bishops in the United States